Simonfa is a village in Somogy County, Hungary.

History
According to László Szita the settlement was completely Hungarian in the 18th century.

References

Populated places in Somogy County